Harlan County is a county located in southeastern Kentucky. As of the 2020 census, the population was 26,831. Its county seat is Harlan. It is classified as a moist countya county in which alcohol sales are prohibited (a dry county), but containing a "wet" city, in this case Cumberland, where package alcohol sales are allowed. In the city of Harlan, restaurants seating 100+ may serve alcoholic beverages.

Harlan County is well known in folk and country music, having produced many prominent musicians. During the 20th century, it was often a center of labor strife between coal mine owners and union workers, especially in the Harlan County War of the 1930s. The coal mining industry began to decline in the 1950s. The loss of jobs resulted in a steadily declining population and depressed economy. Harlan became one of the poorest counties in the United States.

Kentucky's highest natural point, Black Mountain, is in Harlan County.

History

Eastern Kentucky is believed to have supported a large Archaic Native American population in prehistoric times, and has sites of other cliff dwellings. These sites were used by successive cultures as residences and at times for burials.

In 1923, an Indian Cliff Dwelling was discovered near Bledsoe, Kentucky. Built in a south-facing cliff, it was near a stream. While archeology was not yet well-developed as an academic discipline, several professors from the University of Kentucky came to the site to excavate it and try to assess the finds. They included "Dr. William D. Funkhouser, a zoologist; Dr. Arthur McQuiston Miller, a geologist; and Victor K. Dodge (called Major Dodge in the reports), all members of a group of scholars interested in early Native American rockshelters." They arrived soon after the discovery and "took charge of a controlled excavation of the site."  They helped found the first department of anthropology and archaeology at the university, gaining departmental status in 1926.

Historical tribes in this area included the Cherokee and Shawnee.

Before the American Revolutionary War, European Americans considered the area presently bounded by Kentucky state lines to be part of the Virginia colony. In 1776, it was established as Kentucky County by the Virginia colonial legislature, before the British colonies declared independence in the American Revolutionary War. In 1780, the Virginia state legislature divided Kentucky County into three counties: Fayette, Jefferson, and Lincoln.

In 1791 the previous Kentucky County was incorporated into the new nation as a separate state, Kentucky. This change became official on June 1, 1792. In 1799, part of Lincoln County was divided to create Knox County.

Harlan County was formed in 1819 from a part of Knox County. It is named after Silas Harlan. With the help of his uncle Jacob and his brother James, Harlan built a log stockade near Danville, which was known as "Harlan's Station". He had journeyed to Kentucky as a young man with James Harrod in 1774, serving as a scout and hunter. He reached the rank of Major in the Continental Army.

Silas Harlan served under George Rogers Clark in the Illinois campaign of 1778–79 against the British; he commanded a company in John Bowman's raid on Old Chillicothe in 1779, and assisted Clark in establishing Fort Jefferson at the mouth of the Ohio River in 1780. Two years later, in 1782, at the Battle of Blue Licks, he died leading the advance party.

His fiance at the time of his death, Sarah Caldwell, married his brother James Harlan. They were grandparents of John Marshall Harlan, who became an attorney and a U.S. Supreme Court Justice.

Due to a growing regional population the county was reduced in size when Letcher County was formed in 1842, using a part of its territory. It was further reduced when Bell County was formed on August 1, 1867, from parts of it and Knox County. Finally in 1878, its northwestern part was partitioned to form Leslie County and its final boundaries were established.

Coal was a major resource in the county and, as the nation developed industry, the region's coal was exploited in the coal mining industry. Given the harsh conditions of mining, labor attempted to organize to gain better working conditions and pay, beginning in the early 20th century. What was called the Harlan County War in the 1930s consisted of violent confrontations among strikers, strikebreakers, mine company security forces, and law enforcement. These events resulted in the county being called "Bloody Harlan." After the Battle of Evarts, May 5, 1931, Kentucky governor Flem D. Sampson called in the National Guard to restore order.

Ballads sung on the picket line at the Brookside mine in Harlan County were captured on film by documentarian John Gaventa. The county was the subject of the documentary film Harlan County, USA (1976), directed by Barbara Kopple. It documented organizing during a second major period of labor unrest in the 1970s, particularly around the Brookside Strike.

In 1924, Conda Uless (Ulysses) "Condy" Dabney was convicted in the county of murdering a person who was later found alive.

From the late eighteenth through the mid-nineteenth century, Harlan County and nearby counties were settled by numerous persons of multiracial descent, with African, European and sometimes American Indian ancestors. Many such families were descended from free people of color in colonial Virginia, who formed families of free white women and free, indentured or enslaved African and Black men. Because the mothers were free, their mixed-race children were born free.

Descendants of such free people of color, some of whose members have been called Melungeon, have documented the racial heritage of Harlan's early settlers through 19th-century photographs, DNA analysis such as the Melungeon DNA Project, and historic records.

In 2007, the Ridgetop Shawnee Tribe of Indians formed as a non-profit organization to work on improving the lives of multiracial families and preserving Native American heritage, structures and artifacts in the area. It established the Kentucky Native American Data Bank, which has the names of 1,000 people of documented Native American descent related to this region; it is accessible for free on the Rootsweb Internet site. Now known as the Ridgetop Shawnee, they have become the heritage arm of Pine Mountain Indian Community, LLC, which since 2013 has taken the lead in working on economic development in the region.

In 2019, the county was the site of the 2019 Harlan County coal miners protest, one in a long history of coal mining. Coal miners demanded back payment from a coal company that fired them shortly after declaring bankruptcy. They occupied a railroad track and prevented a coal train from leaving the county for almost two months.

Geography

Features
The headwaters of the Cumberland River are located in Harlan County: Poor Fork (extending from the city of Harlan east past the city of Cumberland and into Letcher County), Clover Fork extending East from above Evarts, and Martins Fork (extending through the city of Harlan west). The confluence is located in Baxter.

Major highways
  U.S. Highway 421
  U.S. Highway 119
  Kentucky Route 38
  Kentucky Route 160

Adjacent counties
 Perry County  (north)
 Letcher County  (northeast)
 Wise County, Virginia   (east)
 Lee County, Virginia  (southeast)
 Bell County  (southwest)
 Leslie County  (northwest)

National protected areas
 Cumberland Gap National Historical Park (part)
  Blanton Forest

Demographics

2000 census
As of the census of 2000, there were 33,202 people, 13,291 households, and 9,449 families residing in the county. The racial makeup of the county was 95.56% White, 2.62% African American, 0.48% Native American, 0.29% Asian, 0.02% Pacific Islander, 0.08% from other races, and 0.95% from two or more races. 0.65% of the population were Hispanics or Latinos of any race.

There were 13,291 households, out of which 32.20% had children under the age of 18 living with them, 54.30% were married couples living together, 13.20% had a female householder with no husband present, and 28.90% were non-families. 27.00% of all households were made up of individuals, and 12.60% had someone living alone who was 65 years of age or older. The average household size was 2.47 and the average family size was 3.00.

The age distribution was 25.00% under the age of 18, 8.50% from 18 to 24, 27.50% from 25 to 44, 25.20% from 45 to 64, and 13.90% who were 65 years of age or older. The median age was 38 years. For every 100 females, there were 91.80 males. For every 100 females age 18 and over, there were 87.80 males.

The median income for a household in the county was $18,665, and the median income for a family was $23,536. Males had a median income of $29,148 versus $19,288 for females. The per capita income for the county was $11,585. About 29.10% of families and 32.50% of the population were below the poverty line, including 40.10% of those under age 18 and 21.00% of those aged 65 or over.

Life expectancy
Of 3,142 counties in the United States in 2013, Harlan County ranked 3,139 in the longevity of both male and female residents. Males in Harlan County lived an average of 66.5 years and females lived an average of 73.1 years compared to the national average for the longevity of 76.5 for males and 81.2 for females. Moreover, the average longevity in Harlan County declined by 0.6 years for males and 2.6 years for females between 1985 and 2013 compared to a national average for the same period of an increased life span of 5.5 years for men and 3.1 years for women. High rates of smoking and obesity and a low level of physical activity appear to be contributing factors to the lowered longevity for both sexes.

Economy
For 100 years, the economy of Harlan County and other counties in eastern Kentucky was based on coal mining. The latter-twentieth-century decline of coal production and employment has led to widespread poverty and high unemployment.

Although coal mining began much earlier, the first shipment of coal by railroad from Harlan County occurred in 1911 and coal production boomed thereafter. Mining employment in Harlan County rose to 13,619 in 1950. The number of employed miners had declined to 764 by June 2016. During the same period, the population of Harlan County declined from 71,000 to less than 28,000. Unemployment has been as high as 20 percent (September 1995) and has consistently been higher than the U.S national average. Unemployment in December 2016 was 9.5 percent, compared to 4.8 percent in the nation as a whole.  Harlan County ranked in the highest 10 percent of all United States counties in the prevalence of poverty among its residents.

Annual per capita personal income in Harlan County was $27,425 in 2014 compared to a national average of $48,112.

By 2016, more than half of the county's income came from transfers from the Federal government such as Social Security, Medicare and Food Stamps.

As of 2018 new jobs are being located in the county as Teleworks USA has opened a hub in the city of Harlan. This has provided over 200 new jobs as of April 2018 
SEKRI, located in the Blair community near the city of Cumberland, also announced expansions and added an additional 100 jobs in March 2018.

Politics
Harlan County's political history resembles West Virginia's. Under the Third and Fourth Party systems it was a Republican county: except when supporting Theodore Roosevelt's "Bull Moose" Party in 1912, it voted Republican for the presidential candidate in every election from 1880 to 1932. However, with increasing unionization in the coal industry, it became a Democratic stronghold for six decades. With the exception of Dwight D. Eisenhower's victories in 1952 and 1956, and Richard Nixon's landslide re-election in 1972 (in which it gave 59.4% of its votes to the Republican incumbent Nixon and 39.6% of its votes to Democratic Presidential nominee George McGovern), it voted blue in every election from 1936 to 2000.

Even in Ronald Reagan's landslide re-election of 1984, Harlan County voted 51.9% for Democratic Presidential nominee Walter Mondale, while incumbent Reagan received 47.1% of the vote. But the decline of the coal industry also changed politics in the county: in the 2004 Presidential election, Harlan County voted for the Republican Presidential nominee for the first time in 32 years; Republican incumbent George W. Bush received 60.2% of the vote, while the Democratic Presidential nominee John Kerry received 39.1% of the vote.

This rightward trend continued in 2008, when Republican Presidential candidate John McCain received 72.3% of the vote, while Democratic Presidential nominee Barack Obama received 26.1% of the vote. In 2012, the Republican gap was even larger, as the Republican Presidential nominee Mitt Romney won the county over the Democratic incumbent Obama by a 64% margin (81.2% to 17.2%). In the 2016 election, its voters supported Republican nominee Donald Trump over Democrat Hillary Clinton by a 72.12% margin (84.87 to 12.75).

Education

Higher education
The county's only higher education institution is Southeast Kentucky Community and Technical College (formerly known as Southeast Community College), a part of the Kentucky Community and Technical College System, with its main campus in Cumberland.

K–12 Harlan County public schools
The county has two K–12 public school districts. Harlan County Public Schools covers all of Harlan County, except for the city of Harlan and some small unincorporated communities adjacent to the city. The district operates one high school, Harlan County High School, which opened in August 2008. The school nickname is Black Bears, reflecting the area's increasing black bear population. The new high school, located in the rural community of Rosspoint east of Harlan, replaced three other high schools:
 Cumberland High School, Cumberland, served students from the cities of Cumberland, Benham, Lynch, and near the Letcher County border.
 Evarts High School, Evarts, served the area from the Harlan City limits to the Virginia border.
 James A. Cawood High School, Harlan, served students in central Harlan County.

The district operates the following K–8 schools:
 Black Mountain Elementary
 Cawood Elementary
 Cumberland Elementary
 Evarts Elementary
 Green Hills Elementary
 James A. Cawood Elementary
 Rosspoint Elementary
 Wallins Elementary

Harlan Independent Schools
Harlan Independent Schools is a separate district covering the city of Harlan and operating the following schools:
 Harlan High School
 Harlan Middle School
 Harlan Elementary School

K–12 private schools
 Harlan County Christian School (Putney)

Economy

Coal companies in Harlan County
 Alpha Natural Resources
 Harlan-Cumberland Coal Company
 JRL Coal Company
 Sequoa Energy
 James River Coal Company
 US Coal

Area attractions

 Black Mountain Off-Road Adventure Area: This off-road park has been voted number one all-terrain vehicle (ATV) destination by ATV Pathfinder for two years running. It consists of more than  set aside for quads and 4WD vehicle recreation. Harlan County also holds the Guinness World Record for the largest ATV parade.
 Cranks Creek Lake
 Kentucky Coal Mining Museum
 Kingdom Come State Park; Elevation: ; Size: ; Location: On the outskirts of the city of Cumberland, and is connected to the Little Shepherd Trail. This state park was named after the popular Civil War novel, The Little Shepherd of Kingdom Come, by Kentucky author John Fox Jr. The park contains a picnic area, hiking trails, a fishing lake, a cave amphitheater, several lookouts and natural rock formations, including Log Rock and Raven Rock. It is the site of the annual Kentucky Black Bear Festival.
 Martins Fork Lake
 Pine Mountain Settlement School

Communities

Cities
 Benham
 Cumberland
 Evarts
 Harlan (county seat)
 Loyall
 Lynch

Census-designated places
 Ages
 Cawood
 Coldiron
 Kenvir
 Pathfork
 South Wallins
 Wallins Creek

Other unincorporated communities

 Alva
 Baxter
 Bledsoe
 Brookside
 Closplint
 Cranks
 Dayhoit
 Elcomb
 Fresh Meadows
 Grays Knob
 Gulston
 Highsplint
 Holmes Mill
 Putney
 Pine Mountain
 Rosspoint
 Smith
 Tacky Town
 Teetersville
 Totz
 Verda

Notable people
 Bernie Bickerstaff, NBA coach
 Rebecca Caudill, author of children's books
 Jerry Chesnut, country music songwriter
 Carl H. Dodd, Korean War soldier and Medal of Honor recipient
 Wah Wah Jones, NBA player
 Nick Lachey, singer, actor
 Cawood Ledford, University of Kentucky basketball and football announcer
 George Ella Lyon, author and poet
 Florence Reece, songwriter
 Louise Slaughter, Congresswoman
 Jordan Smith, Winner of The Voice

In popular culture

Prose
Elmore Leonard's novels Pronto, Riding the Rap, and Raylan feature Raylan Givens, a Harlan County native, and his short story "Fire in the Hole" has Givens returning to Harlan.

In the James Jones novel "From Here to Eternity", Robert E. Lee Prewitt, a bugler in the Army and the main character, is from Harlan County.

Music
Harlan County is mentioned in many versions of the 18th-century folk song "Shady Grove". The famous labor song, "Which Side Are You On?", was written by Florence Reece in 1931 in and about Harlan. It has been covered by many artists from Pete Seeger and the Almanac Singers to Billy Bragg, the Dropkick Murphys, and Natalie Merchant. Harlan is mentioned in the Aaron Watson song "Kentucky Coal Miner's Prayer".

It is mentioned in Robert Mitchum's recording "Ballad of Thunder Road" as a stop along a moonshine route. It is the subject of the Darrell Scott song "You'll Never Leave Harlan Alive", which has been covered by Brad Paisley, Dave Alvin, Kathy Mattea, and Patti Loveless, among others, and has been heard in several versions on the TV drama Justified.

Dierks Bentley's song "Down in the Mine", on his Up on the Ridge album, mentions Harlan. The band Spear of Destiny included the song "Harlan County", on their 1985 album  World Service. Harlan County is mentioned in the Merle Travis song Nine Pound Hammer which he wrote in 1939; it has been covered by many bluegrass artists including Doc Watson.

Wayne Kemp wrote and recorded a song called "Harlan County." Harlan County is also the name of the first album by Jim Ford, 1969, as well as a song bearing the same name. The Dave Alvin song "Harlan County Line" takes place around the area of Harlan. Singer/Songwriter Loudon Wainwright III included a song titled "Harlan County" on his 2014 album I Haven't Got The Blues (Yet). Harlan County is mentioned as the setting of the David Allan Coe song "Daddy Was A God Fearin' Man" in his 1977 album Tattoo.

Steve Earle wrote and recorded "Harlan Man" included on the 1999 Grammy-nominated album " The Mountain" recorded with the Del McCoury Band.

The Cast Iron Filter song "Harlan County, USA" from the 2000 album "Further Down the Line" recounts a dramatization of the Eastover/Brookside coal miners' strike.

Films
 Harlan County, USA (1976).  Documentary film directed by Barbara Kopple depicting the Eastover/Brookside coal miners' strike, which won the Academy Award for Best Documentary Feature.
 Harlan County War (2000). Dramatic film based on the Eastover/Brookside strike. Directed by Tony Bill and starring Holly Hunter.
 Thunder Road (film) (1958). Dramatic film about moonshiners based in Harlan County and starring Robert Mitchum.

Television
 The FX television series Justified (2010–15), created by Graham Yost and based on Elmore Leonard's Raylan Givens novels and short story, is set in the U.S. federal district of Eastern Kentucky and prominently in Harlan County. The show was filmed in California, however, not in Kentucky.
 Kentucky Justice, a reality TV show on National Geographic Channel, is set in Harlan County and follows Sheriff Marvin J. Lipfird & his department.

See also

 National Register of Historic Places listings in Harlan County, Kentucky

References

Further reading
 
 Tom Hansell, Patricia Beaver and Angela Wiley, "Keep Your Eye upon the Scale," 
 G. C. Jones,  "Growing up Hard in Harlan County," published by University Press of Kentucky,

External links

 Harlan County Clerk Office
 Harlan County Chamber of Commerce
 Black Mountain Rec Park – Harlan County's Tourism
 Harlan Daily Enterprise newspaper
 The Pine Mountain Settlement School
 The Kentucky Highlands Project
 Harlan County History and Genealogy

 
Counties of Appalachia
Kentucky counties
1819 establishments in Kentucky
Populated places established in 1819